Costa Rica is a country in Central America, bordered by Nicaragua to the north, Panama to the southeast, the Pacific Ocean to the west, the Caribbean Sea to the east, and Ecuador to the south of Cocos Island. It has a population of around 4.5 million, of whom nearly a quarter live in the metropolitan area of the capital and largest city, San José.

Pharmaceuticals, financial outsourcing, software development, and ecotourism have become the prime industries in Costa Rica's economy. High levels of education among its residents make the country an attractive investing location. Since 1999, tourism earns more foreign exchange than the combined exports of the country's three main cash crops: bananas, pineapples and coffee. Coffee production has played a key role in Costa Rica's history and economy, and by 2006, was the third cash crop export.

Notable firms 
This list includes notable companies with primary headquarters located in the country. The industry and sector follow the Industry Classification Benchmark taxonomy. Organizations which have ceased operations are included and noted as defunct.

References 

 
Costa Rica